Brent may refer to: 

Brent (name), an English given and surname

Place name
In the United States
Brent, Alabama
Brent, Florida
Brent, Georgia
Brent, Missouri, a ghost town
Brent, Oklahoma

In the United Kingdom
 Brent, Cornwall
Brent Knoll, a hill in Somerset, England
Brent Knoll (village), a village at the foot of the hill
East Brent, another village at the foot of the hill
London Borough of Brent, England
South Brent, Devon, England

Elsewhere
Brent, Ontario, a village in Algonquin Provincial Park, Canada
Brent crater, a meteor crater named after the village of Brent, Ontario
Brent oilfield, North Sea

In fiction
 Brent (Planet of the Apes)
 Corey Brent, fictional character on the ITV soap opera Coronation Street
 David Brent, fictional character on the BBC television comedy The Office
 Stefan Brent, fictional character on the ITV soap opera Coronation Street
 Brent Scopes, fictional character from the novel Mount Dragon
 Brent McHale, fictional character from the animated film Cloudy with a Chance of Meatballs

Other uses
Brent Cross tube station, North-west London, England
Brent Cross Shopping Center, a mall in Northern London, close to the terminus to the M1 Highway
Brent Crude, benchmark classification of oil
Brent goose (Branta bernicla), known in North America as brant
Brent International School, the Philippines
Brent's method, a root-finding algorithm
Brent railway station, South Devon, England
Brent sidings, railway freight facility in north-west London, England
Brent Spar, decommissioned oil storage and tanker loading buoy
National Theatre of Brent, British comedy double-act
River Brent, London, England

See also
Bret (disambiguation)
Brett